The 2008 Atlantic hurricane season was an event in the annual tropical cyclone season in the north Atlantic Ocean. An above-average Atlantic hurricane season season, it was the first on record to have a major hurricane in every month from July to November.

The season officially began on June 1, 2008, and ended on November 30, 2008, dates that conventionally delimit the period of each year when most tropical cyclones develop in the Atlantic basin. The season's first storm, Tropical Storm Arthur, formed on May 30, and the last, Hurricane Paloma, dissipated on November 10. Pre-season forecasts noted a high possibility for an above average number of tropical cyclones, primarily due to lingering La Niña effects and abnormally warm sea surface temperatures across the Atlantic basin. Altogether, 16 of the 17 tropical cyclones observed during the season developed into tropical storms. Of these, eight became hurricanes with five intensifying further into major hurricanes. With the exception of Tropical Storm Nana, every tropical cyclone during the season affected land to an extent.

This timeline includes information that was not operationally released, meaning that data from post-storm reviews by the National Hurricane Center, such as a storm that was not operationally warned upon, has been included. This timeline documents tropical cyclone formations, strengthening, weakening, landfalls, extratropical transitions, and dissipations during the season.

By convention, meteorologists use one time zone when issuing forecasts and making observations: Coordinated Universal Time (UTC), and also use the 24-hour clock (where 00:00 = midnight UTC). The National Hurricane Center uses both UTC and the time zone where the center of the tropical cyclone is currently located. The time zones utilized (east to west) prior to 2020 were: Atlantic, Eastern, and Central. In this timeline, all information is listed by UTC first with the respective regional time included in parentheses. Additionally, figures for maximum sustained winds and position estimates are rounded to the nearest 5 units (knots, miles, or kilometers), following the convention used in the National Hurricane Center's products. Direct wind observations are rounded to the nearest whole number. Atmospheric pressures are listed to the nearest millibar and nearest hundredth of an inch of mercury.

Timeline

May

May 31
 0000 UTC (8:00 p.m.
 0600 UTC (2:00 a.m.
 0900 UTC (5:00 a.m.

June
June 1
 The 2008 Atlantic hurricane season officially begins.
 1200 UTC (8:00 a.m.
June 2
 0000 UTC (8:00 p.m. EDT June 1) – Tropical Depression Arthur degenerates into a non-convective remnant low pressure area.

July
July 3
 0600 UTC (2:00 a.m.
 1200 UTC (8:00 a.m. AST) – Tropical Depression Two strengthens into Tropical Storm Bertha to the south of the Cape Verde Islands.
July 7

 0600 UTC (2:00 a.m.
 1800 UTC (2:00 p.m.
 2100 UTC (5:00 p.m.
July 8
 1200 UTC (8:00 a.m. AST) – Hurricane Bertha weakens to a Category 2 hurricane.
 1800 UTC (2:00 p.m. AST) – Hurricane Bertha weakens to a Category 1 hurricane.
July 9
 1800 UTC (2:00 p.m. AST) – Hurricane Bertha restrengthens into a Category 2 hurricane.
July 10
 0600 UTC (2:00 a.m. AST) – Hurricane Bertha weakens to a Category 1 hurricane.
July 13
 1200 UTC (8:00 a.m. AST) – Hurricane Bertha weakens to a tropical storm.
July 18
 1800 UTC (2:00 p.m. AST) – Tropical Storm Bertha strengthens into a Category 1 hurricane for a second time.
July 19
 0000 UTC (8:00 p.m.
 1200 UTC (8:00 a.m. AST) – Tropical Depression Three strengthens into Tropical Storm Cristobal off the coast of South Carolina.
July 20

 0000 UTC (8:00 p.m. AST July 19) – Hurricane Bertha weakens into a tropical storm once again.
 1200 UTC (8:00 a.m. AST) – Tropical Storm Bertha transitions into an extratropical cyclone.
 1200 UTC (8:00 a.m.
July 21
 0530 UTC (1:30 a.m.
July 22
 1200 UTC (8:00 a.m.
July 23
 0000 UTC (7:00 p.m. CDT July 22) – Tropical Storm Dolly intensifies into a Category 1 hurricane.
 1200 UTC (8:00 a.m. AST) – Tropical Storm Cristobal is absorbed by a larger extratropical cyclone.
 1400 UTC (9:00 a.m.
 1820 UTC (1:20 p.m.
 2000 UTC (3:00 p.m.
July 24
 0600 UTC (1:00 a.m. CDT) – Hurricane Dolly weakens to a tropical storm.
July 25
 0000 UTC (7:00 p.m. CDT July 24) – Tropical Storm Dolly weakens to a tropical depression over extreme northern Mexico.
July 26
 0000 UTC (7:00 p.m. CDT July 25) – Tropical Depression Dolly degenerates into a non-convective remnant low pressure area over the mountainous terrain of inland Mexico.

August

August 3
 1200 UTC (7:00 a.m.
August 4
 0000 UTC (7:00 p.m. CDT August 3) – Tropical Depression Five strengthens into Tropical Storm Edouard to the southeast of Louisiana.
August 5
 1200 UTC (7:00 a.m. At this time, Edouard also makes landfall at McFaddin National Wildlife Refuge, Texas.
August 6
 0000 UTC (7:00 p.m. CDT August 6) – Tropical Storm Edouard weakens to a tropical depression over inland Texas.
 0600 UTC (1:00 a.m. CDT) – Tropical Depression Edouard degenerates into a non-convective remnant low pressure area over northern Texas.
 1200 UTC (8:00 a.m. EDT) – A tropical depression develops just west of the northwestern tip of Puerto Rico.<ref
August 15 name=fTCR></ref>
 1430 UTC (10:30 a.m.
August 16
 1145 UTC (7:45 a.m.
August 17
 0900 UTC (5:00 a.m.
August 18

 0700 UTC (3:00 a.m.
 2030 UTC (4:30 p.m.
August 19
 0845 UTC (4:45 a.m.
 1800 UTC (2:00 p.m.
August 21
 1900 UTC (3:00 p.m.
August 23
 0615 UTC (2:15 a.m.
August 24
 0000 UTC (8:00 p.m. EDT August 23) – Tropical Storm Fay weakens to a tropical depression.
August 25

 0000 UTC (8:00 p.m.
 1200 UTC (8:00 a.m. EDT) – Tropical Depression Seven rapidly intensifies into Tropical Storm Gustav.
August 26
 0600 UTC (2:00 a.m. EDT) – Tropical Storm Gustav strengthens into a Category 1 hurricane.
 1800 UTC (2:00 p.m. EDT) – Hurricane Gustav makes landfall on the southwestern peninsula of Haiti with winds of 
 0000 UTC (8:00 p.m. EDT August 26) – Hurricane Gustav weakens to a tropical storm over the southwestern peninsula of Haiti.
 0600 UTC (2:00 a.m. EDT) – Tropical Storm Fay merges with a larger extratropical cyclone.
August 28
 0000 UTC (8:00 p.m.
 1200 UTC (8:00 a.m. EDT) – Tropical Depression Eight strengthens into Tropical Storm Hanna.
 1800 UTC (2:00 p.m.
August 29
 0200 UTC (10:00 p.m.
 1800 UTC (2:00 p.m. EDT) – Tropical Storm Gustav restrengthens into a hurricane.
August 30
 1800 UTC (2:00 p.m.
 2200 UTC (6:00 p.m. Additionally, Gustav makes landfall just east of Los Palacios, Cuba at this intensity.

September
September 1

 0600 UTC (2:00 a.m.
 1200 UTC (8:00 a.m. AST) – Tropical Depression Nine strengthens into Tropical Storm Ike.
 1500 UTC (10:00 a.m.
 1800 UTC (2:00 p.m. AST) – Tropical Storm Hanna strengthens into a Category 1 hurricane north of the Dominican Republic.
September 2
 0000 UTC (7:00 p.m. CDT September 1) – Hurricane Gustav weakens to a tropical storm over southwestern Louisiana.
 0000 UTC (8:00 p.m. Additionally, the system makes landfall near Providencials Island, Caicos Islands at this intensity.
 0000 UTC (8:00 p.m.
 0600 UTC (2:00 a.m. AST) – Tropical Depression Ten strengthens into Tropical Storm Josephine.
 1200 UTC (7:00 a.m. CDT) – Tropical Storm Gustav weakens to a tropical depression.
 1200 UTC (8:00 a.m. AST) – Hurricane Hanna weakens to a tropical storm.
September 3
 0600 UTC (2:00 a.m.
 1800 UTC (2:00 p.m.
 1900 UTC (3:00 p.m.
September 4

 0000 UTC (8:00 p.m. AST September 3) – Hurricane Ike rapidly strengthens into a Category 3 hurricane.
 0600 UTC (2:00 a.m.
 1200 UTC (7:00 a.m. CDT) – Tropical Depression Gustav transitions into an extratropical cyclone over Missouri.
September 5
 1200 UTC (8:00 a.m. AST) – Hurricane Ike weakens to a Category 3 hurricane.
September 6
 0000 UTC (8:00 p.m. AST September 5) – Tropical Storm Josephine weakens to a tropical depression.
 0600 UTC (2:00 a.m. AST) – Tropical Depression Josephine degenerates into a non-convective remnant low-pressure area.
 0720 UTC (3:20 a.m.
 1200 UTC (8:00 a.m. AST) – Hurricane Ike weakens to a Category 2 hurricane.
 1800 UTC (2:00 p.m. AST) – Hurricane Ike rapidly strengthens to a Category 4 hurricane.
September 7
 0600 UTC (2:00 a.m. EDT) – Tropical Storm Hanna transitions into an extratropical cyclone.
 1200 UTC (8:00 a.m. AST) – Hurricane Ike weakens to a Category 3 hurricane.
 1300 UTC (9:00 a.m.
September 8

 0000 UTC (8:00 p.m. EDT September 7) – Hurricane Ike restrengthens to a Category 4 hurricane.
 0215 UTC (10:15 p.m.
 0600 UTC (2:00 a.m. EDT) – Hurricane Ike weakens to a Category 3 hurricane.
 1200 UTC (8:00 a.m. EDT) – Hurricane Ike weakens to a Category 2 hurricane.
 1800 UTC (2:00 p.m. EDT) – Hurricane Ike weakens to a Category 1 hurricane.
September 9
 1400 UTC (10:00 a.m.
September 10
 1800 UTC (2:00 p.m. EDT) – Hurricane Ike restrengthens into a Category 2 hurricane.
September 13
 0700 UTC (2:00 a.m.
 1800 UTC (1:00 p.m. CDT) – Hurricane Ike rapidly weakens to a tropical storm.
September 14
 1200 UTC (7:00 a.m. CDT) – Tropical Storm Ike transitions into an extratropical cyclone.
September 25
 0000 UTC (8:00 p.m.
 0600 UTC (2:00 a.m. AST) – The tropical depression north of the Dominican Republic strengthens into Tropical Storm Kyle.
September 27

 1200 UTC (8:00 a.m.
September 28
 1200 UTC (8:00 a.m.
 1800 UTC (2:00 p.m.
September 29
 0000 UTC (8:00 p.m.
 0600 UTC (2:00 a.m. AST) – Hurricane Kyle weakens to a tropical storm and transitions into an extratropical cyclone.
 0600 UTC (2:00 a.m.
September 30
 1200 UTC (8:00 a.m. AST) – Subtropical Storm Laura transitions into a tropical storm.
 1800 UTC (2:00 p.m.

October
October 1
 1200 UTC (8:00 a.m. AST) – Tropical Storm Laura degenerates into a non-convective remnant low pressure area.
October 6
 0000 UTC (7:00 p.m. CDT October 5) – Tropical Depression Thirteen forms from an area of low pressure over Terminos Lagoon, Campeche.
 1200 UTC (7:00 a.m.
October 7

 0000 UTC (7:00 p.m.
 1200 UTC (7:00 a.m.
 1800 UTC (1:00 p.m. CDT) – Tropical Storm Marco weakens to a tropical depression.
October 8
 0000 UTC (7:00 p.m. CDT) – Tropical Depression Marco dissipates over the mountainous terrain of inland Mexico.
October 12
 0600 UTC (2:00 a.m.
 1200 UTC (8:00 a.m. AST) – The tropical depression west of the Cape Verde Islands strengthens into Tropical Storm Nana.
October 13
 0000 UTC (8:00 p.m.
 0600 UTC (2:00 a.m.
 1200 UTC (8:00 a.m.
October 14
 0000 UTC (8:00 p.m.
 1200 UTC (8:00 a.m. AST) – Tropical Depression Nana degenerates into a non-convective remnant low pressure area in the central Atlantic.
 1200 UTC (8:00 a.m.
 1230 UTC (8:30 a.m.
October 15

 0000 UTC (8:00 p.m. AST October 14) – Tropical Storm Omar strengthens into a Category 1 hurricane.
October 16
 0000 UTC (8:00 p.m. AST October 15) – Hurricane Omar strengthens into a Category 2 hurricane.
 0000 UTC (8:00 p.m. AST October 15) – Tropical Depression Sixteen degenerates into a non-convective remnant low pressure area over the mountainous terrain of east-central Honduras.
 0600 UTC (2:00 a.m. AST) – Hurricane Omar rapidly strengthens into a Category 4 hurricane.
 1200 UTC (8:00 a.m. AST) – Hurricane Omar weakens to a Category 2 hurricane.
 1800 UTC (2:00 p.m. AST) – Hurricane Omar weakens to a Category 1 hurricane.
October 18
 0000 UTC (8:00 p.m. AST October 17) – Hurricane Omar weakens to a tropical storm.
 1200 UTC (8:00 a.m. AST) – Tropical Storm Omar degenerates into a non-convective remnant low-pressure area.

November
November 5
 1800 UTC (2:00 p.m.
November 6

 0600 UTC (2:00 a.m.
November 7
 0000 UTC (8:00 p.m. EDT November 6) – Tropical Storm Paloma rapidly intensifies into a Category 1 hurricane.
November 8
 0000 UTC (8:00 p.m. EDT November 7) – Hurricane Paloma strengthens into a Category 3 hurricane.
 1200 UTC (8:00 a.m.
 2300 UTC (7:00 p.m.
November 9
 0100 UTC (9:00 p.m.
 0600 UTC (2:00 a.m. EDT) – Hurricane Paloma weakens to a tropical storm over Cuba.
 1800 UTC (2:00 p.m. EDT) – Tropical Storm Paloma weakens to a tropical depression.
November 10
 0000 UTC (8:00 p.m. EDT November 9) – Tropical Depression Paloma degenerates into a non-convective remnant low pressure area over Cuba.
November 30
 The 2008 Atlantic hurricane season officially ends.
 what about dec

See also

Lists of Atlantic hurricanes
Timeline of the 2008 Pacific hurricane season

Notes

References

External links

 2008 Tropical Cyclone Advisory Archive, National Hurricane Center and Central Pacific Hurricane Center
 Hurricanes and Tropical Storms – Annual 2008, National Centers for Environmental Information

2008 Atlantic hurricane season
Articles which contain graphical timelines
2008 Atl T